Vijay Anand may refer to:

Vijay Anand (filmmaker) (1934–2004), Bollywood filmmaker, producer, screenwriter, editor, and actor; brother of actor Dev Anand
Vijay Anand (politician) (born 1969), Indian politician

See also

Anand (name)